The 1959 Argentine Primera División was the 68th season of top-flight football in Argentina. The season began on May 3 and ended on November 20. From this season, the AFA allowed substitutions for the first time, but only for an injured goalkeeper. It was the referee who had to check out the injury before allowing the substitution.

San Lorenzo de Almagro achieved its 7th title, also qualifying for the first edition of Copa Libertadores, the international competition organised by CONMEBOL after Copa Aldao has been discontinued since 1955. Central Córdoba (R) was relegated to Primera B.

League standings

Relegation table

References

Argentine Primera División seasons
Argentine Primera Division
1959 in Argentine football